The first African Chess Championship was played in 1998. Ibrahim Hasan Labib and Mohamed Tissir both shared first place with 7/10, but the former took the title.

The 2007 championship was the FIDE Zone 4 qualifier for the Chess World Cup 2007, the next stage in the 2010 World Championship.  Six players qualified for the 2007 World Cup: IM Robert Gwaze (Zimbabwe), IM Pedro Aderito (Angola), IM Essam El Gindy (Egypt), GM Bassem Amin (Egypt), GM Ahmed Adly (Egypt), and FM Khaled Abdel Razik (Egypt).

Winners 
{| class="sortable wikitable"
! Year !! City !! Winner !! Women's winner
|-
| 1998 ||       Cairo       ||           ||
|-
| 1999 ||	Agadir	||	  ||
|-
| 2001 ||	Cairo	||	  || 
|-
| 2003 ||	Abuja	||	 || 
|-
| 2005 ||	Lusaka	||	 ||  
|-
| 2007 ||       Windhoek     ||       || 
|-
| 2009 ||  Tripoli ||   || 
|-
| 2011 ||   Maputo  ||  || 
|-
| 2013 ||       Tunis ||       || 
|-
| 2014 ||       Windhoek ||       || 
|-
| 2015 ||  Cairo  ||       || 
|-
| 2016 ||  Kampala  ||    || 
|-
| 2017 ||  Oran  ||       || 
|-
| 2018 ||  Livingstone  ||  || 
|-
| 2019 ||  Hammamet  || || 
|-
| 2020 ||colspan="3"| Not held due to the COVID-19 pandemic in Africa
|-
| 2021 || Lilongwe ||  || 
|-
| 2022 ||  Lagos  ||       || 
|}

Multiple winners – Open

Multiple winners – Women

Wins by country – Open

Wins by country – Women

Notes 

GM Ahmed Adly is the 2021 African Individual Chess Champion.
WIM Jesse February is crowned 2021 African Individual Chess Champion.

References 

 Results from TWIC: 1998,2001, 2003, 2005, 2007, 2014
 Results from thechessdrum: 2001,  2003, 2005, 2007, 2009, 2011, 2013, 2014

Supranational chess championships
Chess
Women's chess competitions
1998 in chess
Recurring events established in 1998
Chess in Africa